1 Kings 9 is the ninth chapter of the Books of Kings in the Hebrew Bible or the First Book of Kings in the Old Testament of the Christian Bible. The book is a compilation of various annals recording the acts of the kings of Israel and Judah by a Deuteronomic compiler in the seventh century BCE, with a supplement added in the sixth century BCE. This chapter belongs to the section focusing on the reign of Solomon over the unified kingdom of Judah and Israel (1 Kings 1 to 11). The focus of this chapter is the Solomon's achievements.

Text
This chapter was originally written in the Hebrew language and since the 16th century is divided into 28 verses.

Textual witnesses
Some early manuscripts containing the text of this chapter in Hebrew are of the Masoretic Text tradition, which includes the Codex Cairensis (895), Aleppo Codex (10th century), and Codex Leningradensis (1008).

There is also a translation into Koine Greek known as the Septuagint, made in the last few centuries BCE. Extant ancient manuscripts of the Septuagint version include Codex Vaticanus (B; B; 4th century) and Codex Alexandrinus (A; A; 5th century).

Old Testament references
: 
:

God's response to Solomon (9:1–9)
With the completion of the Temple, God did not need to appear to Solomon in Gibeon (verse 2) but in Jerusalem, assuring Solomon of the continuation of his dynasty and the temple, as long as God's laws were kept. The destruction of the Temple and the loss of land are predicted here, as well as the possibility of return, so this section contains two
things: 'an explanation for woe and an offer of salvation'.

The tribute to Tyre (9:10–14)
Several times 1 Kings 9–10 overlaps with –, bracketing the construction of the temple. After paying Hiram of Tyre with agricultural products, Solomon gave a strip of land in Galilee (at the Bay of Akko), but Hiram was not satisfied with this gift. However, in 2 Chronicles 8:2 it is asserted that Hiram also gave Solomon some cities as a present.

Verse 14
Then Hiram sent the king one hundred and twenty talents of gold.
"120 talents": about 4 tons, or 4 metric tons. One talent was about 75 pounds or 34 kilograms.

Construction of towns and forced labor (9:15–28)
This section parallels the narrative in 1 Kings 5:13–18, emphasizing that Israelites were not employed as forced labor, but 'only' Canaanites, for the construction of various cities outside Jerusalem. Currently, there are archaeological excavation of the cities in the list, in particular of Gezer, Megiddo, and Hazor. In Jerusalem, Solomon expanded the construction of 'Millo' (verse 15), a term which is probably related to the meaning of 'to fill', referring to a substructure designed to secure the sloping terrain of the palace grounds (cf 2 Samuel 5:9; 1 Kings 11:27; 2 Kings 12:20).  
Pharaoh's daughter (verse 16) moved to her own palace (verse 24).  
Solomon's triannual sacrificial feasts at the temple was mentioned in verse 25, followed by a report of Solomon's shipping expedition from Red Sea (or 'Reed Sea, cf. Exodus 14), to Ophir, a place that could be near Aden or on the Horn of Africa.

Verse 15

And this is the account of the forced labor that King Solomon drafted to build the house of the Lord and his own house and the Millo and the wall of Jerusalem and Hazor and Megiddo and Gezer
"Hazor", also Chatsôr, translated in LXX as Hasōr and Tell el-Qedah: now an archaeological tell in Israel, Upper Galilee, north of the Sea of Galilee, in the northern Korazim Plateau.
"Megiddo" ("Tel Megiddo" (Tell al-Mutesellim, lit.
"Gezer": now Tel Gezer), in  – Tell Jezar or Tell el-Jezari, an archaeological site in the foothills of the Judaean Mountains at the border of the Shfela region roughly midway between Jerusalem and Tel Aviv.

See also

Related Bible parts: Leviticus 26, Deuteronomy 28, 2 Samuel 7, 1 Kings 7, 1 Kings 8, 2 Chronicles 7, 2 Chronicles 8

Notes

References

Sources

External links
 Jewish translations:
 Melachim I - I Kings - Chapter 9 (Judaica Press). Hebrew text and English translation [with Rashi's commentary] at Chabad.org
 Christian translations:
 Online Bible at GospelHall.org (ESV, KJV, Darby, American Standard Version, Bible in Basic English)
 1 Kings chapter 9. Bible Gateway

09
Phoenicians in the Hebrew Bible